South Carolina Highway 61 (SC 61) is a  state highway in the U.S. state of South Carolina. The highway is designated on a north–south direction, but physically travels in an east–west direction, from SC 30 in Charleston to U.S. Route 78 (US 78) near Branchville.

Route description

St. Andrew's Boulevard

The easternmost section of SC 61 is named St. Andrew's Boulevard. This section travels from US 17 to SC 171. It is mostly residential buildings that have been rezoned commercial.

Ashley River Road

Ashley River Road is the portion of SC 61 that travels through Charleston near the Ashley River from SC 171 to SC 165. It is four lanes near Sam Rittenberg Boulevard, but becomes two lanes through the scenic stretch. Along the two-lane stretch, there are many large oaks and historic plantations. The SC 61/Ashley River Road exit from Interstate 526 (I-526) actually exits onto SC 461 (Paul Cantrell Boulevard).

Points of interest along Ashley River Road:
 Drayton Hall
 Magnolia Plantation and Gardens and the Audubon Swamp Garden
 Middleton Place Plantation
 Shadowmoss Plantation - Golf Club & Residential
 MacLaura Hall - Private Residential

Beech Hill Road

Beech Hill Road is the section of SC 61 that travels from SC 165 to US 17A. The Legend Oaks Plantation is south of this section of highway.

Augusta Highway

Augusta Highway is the longest section of SC 61 from US 17A to the westernmost end of SC 61 where it merges into US 78.

National Register of Historic Places

Some or all of Ashley River Road was named to the National Register of Historic Places in 1983. In 1993, it was included in the Ashley River Historic District.

History

South Carolina Highway 65

South Carolina Highway 65 (SC 65) was a state highway that existed in the southeastern part of Bamberg County, the northern part of Colleton County, and the southern part of Dorchester County. It was established in 1929 from U.S. Route 78 (US 78; now Farrells Road) in Farrells Crossroads to SC 64 southeast of Givhans. It was also proposed to continue to the southeast to meet SC 61 (now SC 165 Connector). In 1932, the proposed portion was shifted to the northeast, to follow SC 64 across the Ashley River and then southeast to meet SC 61 (now SC 165 south of Summerville. In 1933, the highway was extended northwest and north-northwest, following US 78 until they met the U.S. Highway's new routing west-southwest of Branchville. Also, its proposed path near Summerville was completed. In December 1950, it was rerouted onto its 1929 path, replacing SC 650 to end at SC 61 (now SC 165 Conn.) in Cooks Crossroads. The portion of the former path not concurrent with SC 64 was redesignated as SC 642. In 1952, SC 65 was redesignated as SC 61.

Future
Developers continue to build more homes further and further down Ashley River Road. A great deal of controversy was created about overdevelopment when the City of North Charleston annexed the 6,600-acre tract known as Watson Hill. The tract was sold by MeadWestvaco to private developers who then requested the annexation by North Charleston. The town of Summerville tried to rush an annexation to block North Charleston which ended in a court battle. Summerville later rescinded and backed away from its annexation attempt. The slump in the economy, 2008–2010, forced these developers to sell and the property was repurchased by MeadWestvaco.

A recent public meeting suggested that if development is to occur, instead of widening Ashley River Road to alleviate congestion, Glenn McConnell Parkway, also known as SC 461, could be extended beyond its terminus at Bees Ferry Road. This is possible since Glenn McConnell Parkway travels parallel to SC 61.

Major intersections

Special routes

Charleston alternate route

South Carolina Highway 61 Alternate (SC 61 Alt.) was an alternate route that existed west of Charleston, in what is now the West Ashley portion of the city. It was established in 1940 on Wappoo Road between U.S. Route 17 (US 17) and SC 61. In 1947, it was decommissioned.

Charleston connector route

South Carolina Highway 61 Connector (SC 61 Conn.) is a connector route in the West Ashley portion of Charleston. It is actually the SC 61 mainline. On the South Carolina Department of Transportation's Charleston city map, the portion of SC 61 on either side of the SC 461 (Paul Cantrell Boulevard) intersection is signed as a connector route.

Dorchester County connector route

South Carolina Highway 61 Connector (SC 61 Conn.) is a connecting route south-southwest of Summerville and is in the southeastern part of Dorchester County. This highway serves to connect SC 61 and SC 165. It is known as Cook's Cross Road and is an unsigned highway.

It begins at an intersection with the SC 61 mainline (Ashley River Road) just southeast of Cooks Crossroads, which is the intersection of SC 61 and SC 165. It travels to the north and curves to the northwest. After a curve to the north-northwest, it curves back to the northwest and reaches its northern terminus, an intersection with SC 165.

Summerville alternate route

South Carolina Highway 61 Alternate (SC 61 Alt.) was an alternate route that existed south of Summerville. It was established in December 1936 on Stallsville Loop between two intersections with SC 61 (now SC 165). In 1947, it was decommissioned. Its west–east portion in now still Stallsville Loop, but its south–north portion is part of Trolley Road.

See also

References

External links

 
 CharlestonWiki Highway 61 article
SC 61 South Carolina Hwy Index

Roads on the National Register of Historic Places in South Carolina
061
National Scenic Byways
National Register of Historic Places in Dorchester County, South Carolina
National Register of Historic Places in Charleston County, South Carolina
Individually listed contributing properties to historic districts on the National Register in South Carolina
Transportation in Charleston, South Carolina
Transportation in Dorchester County, South Carolina
Transportation in Colleton County, South Carolina
Transportation in Bamberg County, South Carolina